Cvetka Bevc (born 29 October 1960) is a Slovene writer and poet.

Bevc was born in Slovenj Gradec in 1960. She studied musicology and comparative literature at the University of Ljubljana and also attended post-graduate study at University College Cork. She worked as an editor at a music journal for young people (Glasbena mladina) and at the national broadcasting house and the Slovene Writers' Association. She writes poetry, prose, radio plays and children's stories. Her novel Potovci (Travellers) was one of the five finalists for the 2012 Kresnik Award.

Published works

 prose
 Prigode Špelce Žvekič, 2003	
 Soba gospe Bernarde, 2007	
 Zgodbe iz somraka, 2007	
 Škampi v glavi, 2010
 Desetka, 2011
 Potovci (Travellers), 2011

 poetry collections
 Prelet žerjavov, 2004
 Med ločjem, 2005
 Odbleski, 2009

 children's books
 Klavirski duhec Jošti, 2005
 Abecednik zaljubljene krastače, 2007
 Labod Zaki najde starše, 2008
 Veverica Mica in druge pravljice iz Zelenega gozda, 2009
 Pesem za vilo, 2009

References

Slovenian women writers
Slovenian children's writers
Slovenian musicologists
Women musicologists
Living people
1960 births
People from Slovenj Gradec
University of Ljubljana alumni
Alumni of University College Cork
Slovenian women children's writers